Edgar Montgomery Cullen (1843 – 1922) was an American lawyer, judge, and politician from the state of New York. Cullen is best remembered as the Chief Judge of the New York Court of Appeals from 1904 to 1913.

Biography

Early years

Edgar Montgomery Cullen was born December 4, 1843 in Brooklyn, Kings County, New York, the second son of Dr. Henry J. Cullen (1805–1874) and Elizabeth McCue. He attended the Kinderhook Academy and graduated from Columbia College in 1860. After leaving Columbia, Cullen enrolled at the Rensselaer Polytechnic Institute, until his studies were interrupted by the outbreak of the American Civil War.

In 1861, he was commissioned a lieutenant in the First United States Infantry of the regular army, and in 1862 became colonel of the 96th New York Volunteer Infantry at the age of just 19. Cullen took over command of Hiram Burnham's brigade following that officer's death at the Battle of Chaffin's Farm. After his discharge from the Union Army, he resumed at first his engineering studies, but soon changed to the study of law, and was admitted to the bar in 1867.

Legal career

Cullen became active in Democratic Party politics and served from 1872 to 1875 as an Assistant District Attorney of Kings County. In 1876 he served as a top advisor on the staff of Governor Samuel J. Tilden.

Cullen was elected as  a justice of the New York Supreme Court in 1880. He was re-elected to a second 14-year term in 1894. In 1900, Culllen was one of the first three justices appointed under the amendment of 1899 to the Court of Appeals.

After the resignation of Alton B. Parker to run for President of the United States in September 1904, Cullen was appointed by Governor Benjamin Barker Odell, Jr. as Chief Judge of the Court of Appeals. In November 1904, he was elected to a full 14-year term as Chief Judge, nominated as a fusion candidate by Republicans and Democrats.

In 1913, he presided at the impeachment trial of Governor William Sulzer, and voted against conviction.

Cullen retired from the bench at the end of 1913 when he reached the constitutional age limit of 70 years. Afterwards he resumed the practice of law when he joined the law firm Cullen & Dykman based out of 144 Montague Street, Brooklyn.

Cullen was feted at the time of his retirement with a banquet in the grand ballroom of the Waldorf-Astoria Hotel, hosted by the Brooklyn Bar Association and attended by 450 of the most prominent figures in New York political and legal circles, including former Governor and sitting Supreme Court Justice Charles Evans Hughes. In his speech to the gathering, Cullen expressed pride in the legal profession and offered criticism of President Woodrow Wilson's call for judicial appeal to be "short, sharp, and decisive" so that government could more expeditiously function.

Cullen responded:

Death and legacy

Edgar M. Cullen died on May 23, 1922 at his home at 144 Willow Street in Brooklyn following a serious "stroke of apoplexy," from which he did not recover. He was 78 years old at the time of his death. Cullen's body was buried at the Green-Wood Cemetery in his native Brooklyn.

Footnotes

Further reading

 Appointed to Court of Appeals, New York Times, Jan. 2, 1900.
 The Republican Ticket, New York Times, Sept. 16, 1904.

External links
 Lawrence Kestenbaum (ed.),  "Edgar M. Cullen," Political Graveyard.com, www.politicalgraveyard.com/

1843 births
1922 deaths
Burials at Green-Wood Cemetery
Chief Judges of the New York Court of Appeals
People from Brooklyn
New York Supreme Court Justices
Columbia College (New York) alumni
Union Army officers
Rensselaer Polytechnic Institute alumni
People of New York (state) in the American Civil War
19th-century American lawyers
19th-century American judges
20th-century American judges